Aleksandr Fyodorovich Avdeyev (5 August 1916 – 12 August 1942) was a Soviet fighter ace of World War II with 13 victories claimed. He participated in the Soviet-Finnish War of 1939–1940 (Winter War). He was awarded the title of Hero of the Soviet Union on 10 February 1943.

Early life
He was born in the village of Bolshaya Talinka in Tambov Governorate. In the 1930s his family had to move to Lyublino (now a district of Moscow). There he has graduated from factory-and-workshop school and worked as a metalworker in a foundry. After work he attended an Air club in Podolsk.
In 1938 he joined the army and attended the Borisoglebsk Military Air College.

World War II

From the beginning of the German-Soviet War he served on the Leningrad Front with 153 IAP as a Leytenant and was later promoted to Starshiy Leytenant and Flight commander. In 1941 he claimed 7 victories in 189 missions. Piloting a Polikarpov I-153 biplane, he shot down a future high-scoring German ace Lt. Walter Nowotny of JG 54 over Saaremaa on 19 July 1941 in Bf 109 E-7 (W.Nr. 1137) "White 2" over Riga Bay. In that fight Avdeyev's plane was also shot down and he subsequently spent a month in hospital due to injuries sustained during the crash.

In August 1942 he served as a P-39 Airacobra pilot on the Voronezh Front. On 12 August 1942 he was the first Airacobra pilot who used a ramming attack to down an opponent. His victim was possibly Fw. Franz Schulte of 6./JG 77, an ace with 46 victories. Both pilots were later buried in Novaya Usman, a village near Voronezh.

Avdeyev was awarded the Order of Lenin, the Order of the Red Banner, the Order of the Red Star.

External links
Biography on the site "warheroes.ru

1916 births
1942 deaths
People from Tambovsky District, Tambov Oblast
People from Tambovsky Uyezd
Communist Party of the Soviet Union members
Soviet Air Force officers
Russian aviators
Soviet military personnel of the Winter War
Soviet World War II flying aces
Heroes of the Soviet Union
Recipients of the Order of Lenin
Recipients of the Order of the Red Banner
Recipients of the Order of the Red Star
Pilots who performed an aerial ramming
Soviet military personnel killed in World War II